The 1997 Pilot Pen International was a men's tennis tournament played on outdoor hard courts at the Cullman-Heyman Tennis Center in New Haven, Connecticut in the United States and was part of the Championship Series of the 1997 ATP Tour. It was the 25th edition of the tournament and ran from August 11 through August 17, 1997. First-seeded Yevgeni Kafelnikov won the singles title.

Finals

Singles

 Yevgeni Kafelnikov defeated  Pat Rafter 7–6(7–4), 6–4

Doubles

 Mahesh Bhupathi /  Leander Paes defeated  Sébastien Lareau /  Alex O'Brien 6–4, 6–7, 6–2

References

External links
 ITF – tournament edition details

Pilot Pen International
Volvo International
Pilot Pen International
Pilot Pen International
Pilot Pen International